Jurie van Tonder (born 9 August 1980 in Windhoek) is a Namibian rugby union scrum-half. Van Tonder competed for the Namibia national rugby union team at the 2007 Rugby World Cup.

References

1980 births
Living people
Namibia international rugby union players
Namibian Afrikaner people
Namibian people of South African descent
Namibian rugby union players
Rugby union players from Windhoek
Rugby union scrum-halves
White Namibian people